Luiz DePalma - Sebastian (born 24 March 1969) is the moniker of Sebastian Just Sebastian Dutch composer, producer, He is also the founder of Move Inc. A Dutch underground record label from 1992 to 1996, on which he produced the 1994 club classic "Partners" off the Vive la Trance EP. Move Inc. was rebooted as Audiomotion Recordings in 2010, on which he releases all his current work as Sebastian Just Sebastian, Luiz DePalma, Artwerk, Orcio Minorenne and Tapeslave.

Education
Sebastian - Luiz DePalma started playing violin in 1977 at the age of eight with Ig Henneman. Drums in 1979 at the Sweelinck Conservatorium with Ton Rooyers in Amsterdam. Continued his study at the Koninklijk Conservatorium in Leeuwarden (NL) from 1991 and so, got involved in electronic music production and recording. Played in numerous Dutch bands as keyboardplayer, bassplayer and drummer. In 1991 teamed up with Dutch DJ’s and house & disco pioneers Saul Poolman and Eddie de Clerq.

Present
In 2011, Luiz DePalma moved to Bogotá where he opened his studio Vila Maya One and started Audiomotion Recordings. He released the entire back catalog of unreleased productions from between 2002 – 2009. Including the remastered back catalog works by Move Inc. dating from 1992. Sebastian Just Sebastian is known for his recognizable sound as for his considerable output of works. In 2015, Sebastian moved back to Amsterdam and continues to run the labels Audiomotion Recordings and Zeroaudio. Sebastian produces under the aka's: Luiz DePalma Tapeslave, Artwerk, Dusty Skateboard, Proxy Page and Orcio Minorenne (which is an anagram for Ennio Morricone).

Discography

References

External links
 Audiomotion Recordings
 AMR discography at Spotify
 Luiz DePalma at Discogs

Living people
Musicians from Amsterdam
Dutch composers
Dutch house musicians
Dutch electronic musicians
Nu-disco musicians
Club DJs
Remixers
1969 births